Warren County Library may refer to:

Warren County Library branch of the Greater Clarks Hill Regional Library System
Warren Public Library in Warren, Ohio